Esplugues de Llobregat is a municipality of the Barcelona metropolitan area. Formerly in the Barcelonès, since 1990 it has been part of the comarca of Baix Llobregat. During recent decades Esplugues has evolved from a predominantly industrial town to a more diverse service area, preserving, however, its cultural and historical identity.

It is known for its characteristic old quarter, the only one in the Baix Llobregat area with such evocative and romantic areas. The winding Carrer de Montserrat goes through the sprawling architectural complex built between 1968 and 2017 by sculptor Xavier Corberó. The mansion of Can Cortada was home to the Baron Maldà, author of Calaix de Sastre, the most representative work of Catalan literature of the late 18th century. Esplugues holds a remarkable natural area with parks and green spaces such as the Park of Solidarity, the Park of Torrents and the Can Vidalet Park. From the mountain of Sant Pere Màrtir, it is possible to enjoy a picturesque viewpoint of the entire town.

The German School of Barcelona and the American School of Barcelona are located in town and attract wealthy expatriate families who decide to get their kids educated there. Due to its proximity to the Camp Nou stadium, many famous footballers reside in Esplugues, such as Gerard Piqué and his wife Shakira, Andrés Iniesta, and Dani Alves, as well as the motorcycle racer Sete Gibernau, the former World Number 1 tennis player Arantxa Sánchez, and other personalities in Spanish showbiz.

City connection 
Esplugues de Llobregat has an excellent road network, being connected to the highways B-20 and B-23, the N-340 road, and its location right across from the Avinguda Diagonal, the most important avenue in Barcelona.

It is linked to Barcelona through the following bus lines: 57, 63, 67, 68, 157, metropolitan buses, and T1, T2 and T3 Trambaix lines. The only metro station in the area is Can Vidalet, on the L5 line. Two other stops are under construction and will be opened in 2018.

History
The first nominal legal land section, a little portion of land with a few homes and a few inhabitants, in what is today Esplugues was made in 1096. The first documents which talk about a town called Esplugues de Llobregat date from the 14th century.

Demography

Education

International schools in the municipality include:
 German School of Barcelona
 American School of Barcelona

Twin towns
  Ahrensburg, Germany
  Macael, Spain

Notable people 
 Ailyn, singer and songwriter
 Carme Chacón, politician and minister of Defence
 Xavier Corberó, sculptor
 Óscar Jaenada, actor
 Mercedes Milá, journalist
 Lorenzo Milá, journalist
 Pilar Giménez García, musician
 Gerard Piqué, football player
 Víctor Ruiz, football player

References 

 Panareda Clopés, Josep Maria; Rios Calvet, Jaume; Rabella Vives, Josep Maria (1989). Guia de Catalunya, Barcelona: Caixa de Catalunya.  (Spanish).  (Catalan).

External links 
 Official site (in Catalan)
 Government data pages 

 
Populated places in Baix Llobregat